The 2012 Liga Premier, also known as the Astro Liga Premier for sponsorship reasons, is the ninth season of the Liga Premier, the second-tier professional football league in Malaysia.

The season was held from 11 January and concluded on 23 July 2012.

The Liga Premier champions for 2012 season was ATM. The champions and runners-up were both promoted to 2013 Liga Super.

Teams

A total of twelve teams will contest the league, including eight sides from the 2011 Liga Premier season, two newly promoted teams from 2011 Liga FAM and two relegated teams from the 2011 Liga Super season.

Pahang and Perlis were relegated from 2011 Liga Super after finishing the season in the bottom two places of the league table.

2011 Liga FAM champions Betaria and runner-up MB Johor Bahru secured direct promotion to this season Liga Premier.

  ATM
  Betaria1
  Harimau Muda B3
  Johor
  MB Johor Bahru1
  MP Muar
  Pahang2
  Perlis2
  PDRM
  Pos Malaysia
  Sime Darby
  USM
Note:
1Promoted from 2011 Liga FAM
2Relegated from 2011 Liga Super
3Harimau Muda, the national team feeder project team was replaced fully with Harimau Muda B for this season

Team summaries

Stadia

Note:
 + estimated capacity
 1 Betaria currently using Hang Tuah Stadium in Malacca, Malacca
 2 Pahang currently using Temerloh Mini Stadium in Temerloh, Pahang
 3 PDRM currently using Tuanku Abdul Rahman Stadium in Paroi, Negeri Sembilan
 4 Both Johor and MB Johor Bahru used Pasir Gudang Corporation Stadium in Pasir Gudang and Sultan Ibrahim Stadium in Muar respectively from January until the end of March 2012.

Personnel and kits

Note: Flags indicate national team as has been defined under FIFA eligibility rules. Players and Managers may hold more than one non-FIFA nationality.

Nike has produced a new match ball, named the T90 Tracer, which will be electric blue, black and white and also a high-visibility version in yellow. Additionally, Lotto will provide officials with new kits in black, yellow, and red for the season.

Coaching changes

League table

Results

Fixtures and Results of the 2012 Liga Premier season.

Week 1

Week 2

Week 3

Week 4

Note:
The Sime Darby - ATM match was originally set to be played on the Friday 20th but was postponed due to heavy rain when ATM were leading 2:0. The game was replayed the next day which Sime Darby went on to win 2:1

Week 5

Week 6

Week 7

Week 8

Week 9

Week 10

Week 11

Week 12

Note:
The venue for the match between Harimau Muda B and Perlis was changed from National Stadium, Bukit Jalil to UiTM Stadium, Shah Alam, Selangor

Week 13

Week 14

Week 15

Week 16

Week 17

Week 18

Week 19

Week 20

Week 21

Week 22

Results table

Play-offs

Liga Super/Liga Premier
The play-off matches to determine promotion and relegation will be held at Hang Tuah Stadium and Hang Jebat Stadium, Malacca from 17 July to 19 July 2012, as next season Liga Super will be reduced to 12 teams from 14 teams this season. Team that finished 11th in the Liga Super, Sarawak will meet second placed team in Liga Premier, Pahang while team that finished 12th in the Liga Super, Kedah will meet team that finished 13th in the Liga Super, Sabah. The winner of both semi-final match will meet in the final to determine who will stay in the 2013 Liga Super. The winner will stay in the Liga Super; the other 3 teams will be relegated to 2013 Liga Premier.

Semi Final 1

Semi Final 2

Final

Liga Premier/FAM League
The play-off matches to determine promotion and relegation was held at Hang Tuah Stadium and Hang Jebat Stadium, Malacca on 17 July 2012. Team that finished 7th in the Liga Premier, Pos Malaysia met second placed team in FAM League, Shahzan Muda, while team that finished 9th in the Liga Premier, MP Muar met team that finished 10th in the Liga Premier, Betaria. The winner of both matches stay in the Liga Premier; the losing teams will be relegated to 2013 Liga FAM.

Pos Malaysia and MP Muar won their respective matches and thus stay in Liga Premier next season. Losing teams are Shahzan Muda and Betaria; both will play in FAM League next season. Later, as a result of MP Muar decision to pull out of the league, another play-off match was arranged between Betaria and UiTM, the 3rd place club in the FAM League. Betaria won the match and retained their place in the Liga Premier.

Match 1

Match 2

Match 3

Season statistics

Top scorers

Clean sheets

Most clean sheets: 4
ATM
Fewest clean sheets: 0
MB Johor Bahru
Perlis
Harimau Muda B
MP Muar

Foreign players

Note:
 * Harimau Muda B will not be permitted any foreign player as the team represents the Malaysia national under-19 football team

See also
 List of Liga Premier seasons
 2012 Liga Super
 2012 Liga FAM
 2012 Piala FA

References

External links
Football Association of Malaysia
2012 Liga Premier statistics

Malaysia Premier League seasons
2
Malaysia
Malaysia